Hon James Burty David GCSK MP was a Mauritian politician. David received his Diploma in Education at the University of London and doctorate at the University of Bordeaux. He joined the Labour Party in 1964, which he served successively as president, secretary general and director of communication. David was minister of education from 1995 to 1997, Minister of Environment and local authorities from 1997 to 2000 and Minister of Local Government, Rodrigues and Outer Islands since 2005. He was a journalist of Freelance, teacher and afterwards rector at Eden College and an author of many school manuals in French. In 2010 he was awarded the Grand Commanders of the Order of the Star and Key of the Indian Ocean (GCSK) for remarkable contribution in the political, social and educational fields.

References

https://www.lexpress.mu/article/d%C3%A9c%C3%A8s-du-ministre-des-administrations-r%C3%A9gionales-james-burty-david-ce-13-d%C3%A9cembre
https://www.5plus.mu/node/7249

1946 births
Members of the National Assembly (Mauritius)
Labour Party (Mauritius) politicians
Government ministers of Mauritius
2009 deaths
Grand Commanders of the Order of the Star and Key of the Indian Ocean